The Cadillac Elmiraj is a concept car created by Cadillac and unveiled at the 2013 Pebble Beach Concours d'Elegance on August 15, 2013. It continues the development begun by the Cadillac Ciel concept car. It was named for the Elmira, New York, though some claim it's a dry lake bed that was used for high speed runs.

Overview
The car is a 2-door, 4-seat full-size luxury coupe. It is 205 inches (5207 mm) long, and powered by a 4.5-liter twin turbocharged V8 delivering an estimated . It features a pillarless hardtop profile, a body style abandoned by U.S. automakers since the late 1970s.

The Elmira J is rear-wheel drive and was "constructed with chassis and structural elements of an ongoing Cadillac vehicle development project slated for future production". According to a blog article claiming to be informed by an insider, this platform is under development by the name of Omega, to underpin future top-of-the-line Cadillac cars to compete with the European premium class like the Audi A8, BMW 7 Series, and Mercedes-Benz S-Class.

Niki Smart, lead exterior designer on the Elmira J project, said “We wanted a mature statement for Cadillac where simplicity and subtle adornments create a purposeful presence.” 

“Elmiraj advances Cadillac’s provocative modern design and performance, contrasted with bespoke craftsmanship and luxury,” said Mark Adams, who was back then Cadillac design director. “It explores performance driving, as well as how we’re approaching elevating the Cadillac range and new dimensions of Art & Science philosophy.”

The Elmira J was exposed to a larger public at the 2013 IAA (Internationale Automobilausstellung) in Frankfurt, Germany.

Gallery

References

External links 

 

Elmiraj
Full-size vehicles
Luxury vehicles
Coupés